Abram Davidovich Zamikhovsky (Zamikhovski) (5 January 1908 – 1978) was a Ukrainian chess master and former national champion.

In 1931, he won the 6th Ukrainian Championship in Kharkov ahead of Vsevolod Rauzer
and took 14th in the 7th USSR Championship in Moscow (Mikhail Botvinnik won).
At that time, he was a student of medical faculty at the Kiev University. In 1936, he took 8th in the 16th Championship of Moscow. 
In 1938, he took 2nd, behind Isaac Boleslavsky, in Kiev (10th UKR-ch).

After World War II, Zamikhovsky took 10th at Kiev 1946 (15th UKR-ch, Anatoly Bannik won);
tied for 9-10th at Kiev 1947 (16th UKR-ch, Alexey Sokolsky won);
shared 1st at Kiev 1951 (USSR-ch, qf);
took 14th at Leningrad 1952 (USSR-ch, sf);
won at Kiev 1952 (USSR-ch, qf);
tied for 8-10th at Vilnius 1953 (USSR-ch, sf);
In 1955, he tied for in Kiev (24th UKR-ch, Anatoly Bannik won). In 1956, he took 5th in Kiev (25th UKR-ch, Isaac Lipnitsky won).
In 1957 he took 8th in Kiev (26th UKR-ch, Efim Geller won).

References

External links
Abram Zamikhovsky at 365Chess.com

1908 births
1978 deaths
Ukrainian chess players
Jewish chess players
Ukrainian Jews
20th-century chess players